Zeus and Moses (also known as Moses and Zeus) are a pair of  sandstone formations located in the Island in the Sky District of Canyonlands National Park, in San Juan County, Utah, United States. These rock towers' names refer to Zeus, a god in Greek mythology, and Moses, an important prophet in several religious traditions. Zeus and Moses are composed of Wingate Sandstone, which is the remains of wind-borne sand dunes deposited approximately 200 million years ago in the Late Triassic. Access to the towers is via the four-wheel-drive White Rim Road, and a spur road into Taylor Canyon (Canyonlands National Park backcountry permit required for access). The top of this geological formation rises 900 feet above the canyon floor at road's end, approximately one-half mile away. Precipitation runoff from Zeus and Moses drains into the nearby Green River via Taylor Canyon.

Climbing
The first ascent of Zeus was made in September 1970 by Fred Beckey and Eric Bjornstad via the  East Ridge. This climbing route no longer exists as the bolts have been removed. Sisyphus is a class 5.11 route up dihedrals on the south face.

The second ascent of Moses was made in March 1973 by Stewart Green, Jim Dunn, Doug Snively, and Kurt Rasmussen via the (class 5.11) Dunn Route. Free climbing routes on Moses include  Pale Fire, first climbed by Chip Chase and Charlie Fowler in 1981, along with the classic Primrose Dihedrals route, class 5.11 on the south face, first climbed by Ed Webster and Steve Hong in 1979.

Climate
Spring and fall are the most favorable seasons to visit Zeus and Moses. According to the Köppen climate classification system, it is located in a Cold semi-arid climate zone, which is defined by the coldest month having an average mean temperature below −0 °C (32 °F) and at least 50% of the total annual precipitation being received during the spring and summer.

See also
 Colorado Plateau
 Geology of the Canyonlands area

References

External links
 Canyonlands National Park National Park Service
 Zeus and Moses weather forecast:  National Weather Service
 Zeus Rock Climbing: Mountainproject.com
 Moses Rock Climbing: Mountainproject.com

Landforms of San Juan County, Utah
Colorado Plateau
Canyonlands National Park
Sandstone formations of the United States
Climbing areas of the United States